Cedric Herbert Hassall  (6 December 1919 – 5 September 2017) was a New Zealand chemist.

Life
Born in Auckland on 6 December 1919, Hassall was educated at Auckland Grammar School. He then studied at Auckland University College, graduating Master of Science in 1942, and took a course at Auckland Teachers' Training College.

After lecturing in chemistry at the University of Otago from 1942 to 1945, Hassall completed a PhD in chemistry at the University of Cambridge. In 1948 he was appointed professor of chemistry at the University of the West Indies, and in 1957 he moved to the University College of Swansea to take up the post as professor and head of chemistry.

He served on the advisory board of Bee Vital. He started the Gregynog Natural Products Symposia in 1967.

A scholarship and lecture have been named after him.

Professor Hassall died on 5 September 2017.

Works
Chemistry in the service of medicine, University College of Swansea, 1958,

References

External links
Professor Cedric Hassall, University of The West Indies, Mona

1919 births
People from Auckland
New Zealand chemists
New Zealand Fellows of the Royal Society
University of Auckland alumni
University of the West Indies academics
2017 deaths
People educated at Auckland Grammar School
Academic staff of the University of Otago
Academics of Swansea University
Alumni of the University of Cambridge